Whist is a classic English trick-taking card game which was widely played in the 18th and 19th centuries. Although the rules are simple, there is scope for strategic play.

History 

Whist is a descendant of the 16th-century game of trump or ruff. Whist replaced the popular variant of trump known as ruff and honours. The game takes its name from the 17th-century whist (or wist) meaning quiet, silent, attentive, which is the root of the modern wistful.

According to Daines Barrington, whist was first played on scientific principles by a party of gentlemen who frequented the Crown Coffee House in Bedford Row, London, around 1728. Edmond Hoyle, suspected to be a member of this group, began to tutor wealthy young gentlemen in the game and published A Short Treatise on the Game of Whist in 1742.  It became the standard text and rules for the game for the next hundred years.

In 1862, Henry Jones, writing under the pseudonym "Cavendish", published The Principles of Whist Stated and Explained, and Its Practice Illustrated on an Original System, by Means of Hands Played Completely Through, which became the standard text. In his book, Jones outlined a comprehensive history of Whist, and suggested that its ancestors could include a game called Trionf, mentioned by a sixteenth century Italian poet named Berni, and a game called Trump (or Triumph), mentioned in Shakespeare's Antony and Cleopatra.   Many subsequent editions and enlargements of Jones's book were published using the simpler title Cavendish On Whist. By this time, whist was governed by elaborate and rigid rules covering the laws of the game, etiquette and play which took time to study and master.

In the 1890s, a variant known as bridge whist became popular which eventually evolved into contract bridge. The traditional game of whist survives at social events called whist drives. There are many modern variants of whist played for fun.

Rules
A standard 52-card pack is used. The cards in each suit rank from highest to lowest: A K Q J 10 9 8 7 6 5 4 3 2. Whist is played by four players, who play in two partnerships with the partners sitting opposite each other. Players draw cards to determine dealer and partners, with the two highest playing against the lowest two, who have seating rights.  To comment on the cards in any way is strictly against the rules. One may not comment upon the hand one was dealt nor about one's good fortune or bad fortune. One may not signal to one's partner.

Shuffling and dealing
The cards can be shuffled by any player, though usually the player to dealer's left. The dealer has the right to shuffle last if they wish. To speed up dealing, a second pack can be shuffled by the dealer's partner during the deal and then placed to the right ready for the next hand. The cards are cut by the player on dealer's right before dealing. The dealer deals out the cards, one at a time, face down, so that each player has thirteen cards. The final card, which belongs to the dealer, is turned face up to indicate which suit is trumps. The turned-up trump card remains face up on the table until it is the dealer's turn to play to the first trick, at which point the dealer may pick up the card and place it in his/her hand. The deal advances clockwise.

Play
The player to the dealer's left leads to the first trick with any card in the hand. The other players, in clockwise order, each play a card to the trick and must follow suit by playing a card of the suit led if held. A player with no card of the suit led may play any card, either discarding or trumping. The trick is won by the highest card of the suit led, unless a trump is played, in which case the highest trump wins. The winner of the trick leads the next trick.

Play continues until all thirteen tricks are played, at which point the score is recorded. If no team has enough points to win the game, another hand is played.

Part of the skill involved in the game is one's ability to remember what cards have been played and reason out what cards remain. Therefore, once each trick is played, its cards are turned face down and kept in a stack of four near the player who won the trick. Before the next trick starts, a player may ask to review the cards from the last trick only. Once the lead card is played, however, no previously played cards can be reviewed by anyone.

Scoring

After all tricks have been played, the side that won more tricks scores one point for each trick won in excess of six. When all four players are experienced, it is unusual for the score for a single hand to be higher than two. A game is over when one team reaches a score of five. There are so-called "Hotel Rules" variations in which the teams agree to play to a higher score, such as "American" and "Long" (seven and nine, respectively).

Longer variations of the game, in which the winning score is set higher than five, can be played with "honours" rules in effect. Honours have no effect on the play of a hand, but serve as bonus points that speed up the games as an element of luck. If the partners on a single team are dealt the top four cards (ace, king, queen, jack) in the trump suit, they collect four additional points at the end of the hand; if they are dealt three of these cards, they score two points. Tricks are scored before honours, and the latter cannot be used to score the winning point. 

For example, a game is being played to nine points and the score is tied 6-6. A hand is played, and the winning team takes seven tricks and claims honours for three of the four highest trump cards. They score one point for their tricks, but only one point for their honours since the second point would take them up to nine and win the game. The score after the hand is thus 8-6.

Methods of keeping score include whist marker devices, or a set of four metal counters which can be arranged in different formations for the score values 1 through 9.

Basic tactics 
For the opening lead, it is best to lead your strongest suit, which is usually the longest. A singleton may also be a good lead, aiming at trumping in that suit, as one's partner should normally return the suit led.
1st hand: It is usual to lead the king from a sequence of honours that includes it, including AK (the lead of an ace therefore denies the king).
2nd hand usually plays low, especially with a single honour. However, it is often correct to split honours (play the lower of two touching honours) and to cover a J or 10 when holding Qx and cover a Q when holding the ace.
3rd hand usually plays high, though play the lowest of touching honours. The finesse can be a useful technique, especially in trumps where honours cannot be trumped if they are not cashed.
Discards are usually low cards of an unwanted suit. However, when the opponents are drawing trumps a suit preference signal is given by throwing a low card of one's strongest suit.

Terminology

Deal  One card at a time is given to each player by the dealer starting with the player on the dealer's left and proceeding clockwise until the deck is fully distributed.
Dealer  The player who deals the cards for a hand.
Deck  The pack of cards used for playing comprising, in the case of whist, 52 cards in four suits.
Dummy  In some variations of whist, a hand is turned face up and is played from by the player seated opposite.  This allows for whist to be played by three players.
Finesse The play of a lower honour even though holding a higher one, hoping that the intermediate honour is held by a player who has already played to the trick. To give an example: you hold the ace and queen of hearts. Your right-hand antagonist leads a heart, from which you infer that he holds the king of the same suit and wishes to draw the ace, in order to make his king. You however play the queen, and win the trick; still retaining your ace, ready to win again when he plays his king.
Game Reaching a total score agreed beforehand to be the score played up to.
Grand Slam  The winning, by one team, of all thirteen tricks in a hand.
Hand  Thirteen tricks. (52 cards in the deck divided by four players equals thirteen cards per player.)
Honours  In some variations of whist, extra points are assigned after a game to a team if they were dealt the ace, king, queen, and jack (knave) of the trump suit.
Lead The first card played in a trick.
Lurch Rare or obsolete. To prevent one's adversary from scoring a treble [OED] or in the phrase 'save one's lurch' to just escape losing the game [Hoyle, Britannica 1911].
Pack See Deck.
Rubber Three games.
Small slam The winning, by one team, of twelve tricks in a hand.
Tenace A suit holding containing the highest and third-highest of the suit or (the "minor tenace") second- and fourth-highest.
Trick  Four cards played one each by the players.  
Trump  The suit chosen by the last-dealt card that will beat all other suits regardless of rank.  If two or more trump cards are played in a single trick, the highest-ranking trump wins it.

Variants 
The name "whist" has become attached to a wide variety of games, most based on Classic Whist. McLeod classifies Whist games into a number of sub-groups: the Auction Whist, Boston, Classic Whist and Exact Bidding groups, and games played by numbers of players other than four. The following is a selection within each sub-group.

Auction whist group 
 Bid Whist – a partnership game with bidding, popular among African Americans in the United States.
Dutch Whist, similar to Diminishing Contract Whist, where up to seven players compete to win the most points by betting at the start of each round how many tricks they will win.  In Dutch Whist, players start with one card in round one and go up to seven cards, then play a mid section of rounds with No Trumps (5 points per tick won), Misery (lose 5 points per trick 'won'), Blind (betting on number of tricks before cards are seen). Following the mid-section, seven further rounds are played, starting with seven cards and reducing to one. Trumps each round are pre-designated, following the pattern hearts, clubs, diamonds, spades.  Scoring is based on 10 points for a correct bet, 1 point for every trick won (whether wanted or not).
 Siberian Vint – a predecessor and more primitive form of Vint.
 Skruuvi – a Finnish variant of Vint, which became common in Finland while it was a part of Russia.
 Spades – a contract-type game similar to bid whist; the game's name comes from the fact that spades is always the trump suit.
 Tarneeb (played in the Arab world, a game in which the person who wins the bid picks the trump).
 Vint is a Russian card-game also known as Russian whist, with an ascending auction similar to bridge and more complex scoring than whist.

Boston group 
 Belgian Whist or Colour Whist (whist à la couleur or kleurwiezen) – a Belgian game similar to Solo Whist, but more elaborate).
 Boston – played in 19th-century Europe, played by Count Rostov in Leo Tolstoy's novel War and Peace.
 Diminishing Contract Whist – British variant, combining elements of Solo Whist, Bid Whist and knock-out whist,  players compete individually, not in pairs, and after each hand has been dealt must name the number of tricks to take, scoring one point per trick and a bonus 10 for matching their contract. All 52 cards are dealt for the first hand, 48 for the second, 44 the next and so until a 13th round with just one trick. Trumps are pre-defined for each hand in sequence as: hearts, clubs, diamonds, spades, no trumps, lose all with no trumps — where you lose 10 points per trick taken and some players invariably end up in negative points — hearts, clubs, diamonds, spades, hearts, clubs, diamonds. The total number of tricks bid each round cannot match the number of tricks available, so the dealer each hand must bid with this constraint in mind — sometimes this constraint is waived for the final round if players agree in advance. The winner is the player who has accumulated the most points at the end of the final round.
 Solo Whist – played in Britain; a game where individuals can bid to win five, nine or thirteen tricks or to lose every trick.

Classic whist group 
 Double Sar (also played in south Asia, a variation of Court Piece in which tricks are only captured when the same player wins two tricks in succession. The player then captures all the unclaimed tricks up to that point.)
 Hokm, also known as Court piece or Rang, and alike troefcall (an originally Persian game).
 Minnesota whist – in which there are no trumps, and hands can be played to win tricks or to lose tricks; see also the very similar game of Norwegian whist.
 Quadrette - French variant with a shortened pack in which partners communicate about their cards, and one directs the play of the other. Good for teaching learners and children.
 Swedish Whist – four-hand Swedish game with two contracts: red (positive) and black (negative).

Exact bidding group 
 Blob – British variant of Oh Hell in which players try to predict the exact number of tricks they will take and will be 'blobbed in' if wrong.  Can be played with four or five players.  Six cards each, total number of tricks bid for in each hand cannot add up to six. Person to left of dealer nominates trumps or no trumps and then becomes dealer for next hand.)
 Oh, Hell, Oh Pshaw or Nomination Whist – game for three to seven players in which the number of cards dealt is usually increased or decreased by one in each successive deal.
 Israeli Whist – game related to Oh, Hell, in which one tries to bid the exact number of tricks one will take.
 Romanian Whist – game in which players try to predict the exact number of tricks they will take; similar to Oh, Hell.

Whists for other numbers of players 
 Dummy Whist – a three-player variant of bid whist.
 German Whist – British two-player adaptation of whist without bidding.
 Knock-out Whist, Trumps (UK) or Diminishing Whist – game in which a player who wins no trick is eliminated.

Other games called 'whist' 
 Catch the Ten (also known as Scotch Whist) – two to eight players, 36 cards related to the Ace-Ten family.
 Danish Whist or Call-ace Whist. Combines several whist variants, including Solo Whist and the game Esmakker ("Ace Maker") in which the bidder chooses his partner by calling an ace, who becomes a blind partner, and only revealed by playing the partner ace. Is also often played with 2 or 3 jokers as automatic suit-breaking trump cards. McLeod records two types: one with fixed partnerships and one in which the partner is called by an Ace.
 Ladder Whist. A student game that is effectively the opposite of Knock-out Whist. Players start as 'dogs' with just one card each and win the game by achieving a hand of 7 cards).
 Progressive Whist or Compass Whist, is a competition format in which two players from each table move to the next table after a fixed number of games which are played to a fixed format e.g. with the designated trump suit changing each time.

Whist drive 
A whist drive is a social event at which progressive games of whist are played across a number of tables which are numbered or ordered into a sequence.

In it, the winning (or sometimes losing, dependent on the local custom) pair of a hand "progress" around the room, i.e. one person moves up the table sequence and one person moves down. On arriving at the new table, the next hand is played.

By convention the pair who sits has shuffled and deals after the arriving pair has cut the pack.

A progressive whist drive is normally 24 hands, with each hand being a different trump.
Trumps normally follow the sequence: hearts, clubs, diamonds, spades.

Sometimes a break for refreshments is taken after 12 hands.

Literary references 

 Three of Arthur Conan Doyle's Sherlock Holmes detective stories feature whist. In "The Adventure of the Empty House," Ronald Adair plays whist at one of his clubs shortly before he is murdered. In "The Adventure of the Devil's Foot," Brenda Tregennis plays whist with her brothers George, Mortimer and Owen shortly before she is murdered. In "The Red-Headed League," the banker Mr. Merryweather complains that he is missing his regular rubber of whist in order to help Holmes catch a bank robber.
 Barbey d'Aurevilly, in a story from Les diaboliques, The Underside of the Cards of a Game of Whist, traces the secret affair between a lady and an expert whist player, leading to an  horrific act.
 Edgar Allan Poe briefly mentioned whist in his tale "The Murders in the Rue Morgue," alluding to the analytical mind needed to play:
"[...]
Whist has long been noted for its influence upon what is termed the calculating power; and men of the highest order of intellect have been known to take an apparently unaccountable delight in it, [...]"
 Jules Verne uses whist playing to describe Phileas Fogg in Around the World in Eighty Days:
"[...]
His only pastime was reading the papers and playing whist. He frequently won at this quiet game, so very appropriate to his nature;[...]"

 Whist also figures extensively in C. S. Forester's Horatio Hornblower series. Hornblower is featured as living off his winnings from playing whist while a half-pay Lieutenant, and famously playing whist with subordinate officers before a battle.
 The same is true in the Richard Sharpe series by Bernard Cornwell and was used mainly to portray gambling much the same way poker is today.
 Whist is often enjoyed by Jack Aubrey and Stephen Maturin while at sea in the Aubrey–Maturin series of novels by Patrick O'Brian.
 In Scarlett, the sequel to Gone with the Wind, Alexandra Ripley mentions several times that Scarlett O'Hara is an extremely skillful whist player.
 Miss Elizabeth Bennett and Mr. Wickham discuss Mr. Darcy during a whist party in chapter 16 of Jane Austen's Pride and Prejudice.  The game is also mentioned in her books Mansfield Park, Emma, and Sense and Sensibility.
 In Nikolai Gogol's play The Inspector General, a character Hlestakov lies about playing whist with a group of influential ambassadors to look important. It is also prominent in Gogol's poema, "Dead Souls", and mentioned in Gogol's short stories The Overcoat, The Carriage and The Nose.
 In the opening chapter of Leo Tolstoy's novella The Death of Ivan Ilyich the characters contrast the solemnity of the funeral ceremony with the desire to escape and play whist.
 Whist is played by many characters in Ivan Turgenev’s novel Fathers and Sons.
 In Middlemarch by George Eliot, the game is referenced numerous times as an aristocratic pursuit played frequently at the Vincy residence. In particular, the clergyman Mr. Farebrother supplements his income by playing for money, a pursuit looked down upon by many of his parishioners.
 In his autobiography, Groucho and Me, Groucho Marx talks about playing whist with an ex-girlfriend during a chapter on her husband's insomnia.
 In  The Fiery Cross, Diana Gabaldon describes a high-stakes whist game between Jamie Fraser, "who was indeed an excellent card player. He also knew most of the possible ways of cheating at cards. However, whist was difficult, if not impossible to cheat at,” and Phylip Wylie, who had angered Fraser by making advances to his wife.
 In Life of Henry Clay, Carl Schurz notes that "his fondness for card-playing, which, although in his early years he had given up games of chance, still led him to squander but too much time upon whist."
 In DC Comics' Starman series it is revealed that The Shade is a whist player, and enjoyed playing with Brian Savage (it was also noted that The Shade would regularly win at whist, while Savage would regularly win at poker).
 In The Leopard, by Giuseppe Tomasi di Lampedusa, members of the Falconeri family and the priest play the game, much to the joy of a Piedmontese guest, reassured of their civilized ways.
 In his autobiography, Harold Bauer: His Book, pianist Harold Bauer laments his inability to play well under pressure.  "I suffered similarly whenever I played chess or whist, which excited me so terribly that I always had nightmares from the thought of how I might have played."
 The Secret Agent by Joseph Conrad mentions the game: 
 In Mary Boykin Chesnut's Civil War Diary, whist was the most frequently played card game in her social circle while she lived in Richmond, Virginia.
 In Colson Whitehead's The Underground Railroad, the game is mentioned as a way Ajarry was sold to another slaveowner.
 In R.L. Stine's Ghost Beach in the Goosebumps book series, the game is played by the protagonists.
 In The Pickwick Papers, Mr. Pickwick plays whist:
The rubber was conducted with all that gravity of deportment and sedateness of demeanour which befit the pursuit entitled “whist”—a solemn observance, to which, as it appears to us, the title of “game” has been very irreverently and ignominiously applied
 In In Search of Lost Time, Marcel Proust describes a game of whist played by a group of dinner guests, one of whom is ridiculed for not knowing the rules.
 In Great Expectations, Pip plays whist at Miss Havisham's house.

 In Lalka (The Doll), by Bolesław Prus, whist is mentioned in several scenes; Stanisław Wokulski and Tomasz Łęcki play for money.

August Wilson's Seven Guitars

In culture
 In All American Chump (1936) math whiz Elmer (Stuart Erwin) mentions he plays whist, and is so good that nobody in his hometown will play with him because he always wins.
 In The Young Victoria when Lord Melbourne tries to provide advice to Prince Albert, the Prince tells him, "Lord Melbourne, forgive me but you seem to have confused me with a member of your club. I am not your drinking companion nor your whist partner. I am the husband of your sovereign. And as such, I will make my own decisions, and I neither seek nor invite your advice. Good evening."
 In 2018's The Favourite, Abigail Hill is mentioned to have become impoverished after her father lost their fortune at whist, along with various other references throughout.
 In series 5 of the television show Peaky Blinders, Tommy Shelby recalls a story of his time in France during The Great War while threatening a Member of Parliament who refuses to pay him in full for a hired killing. "I spent a long time waiting for the cavalry, me. One time, me and my comrades waited three days. When the cavalry finally came, an officer on the back of a fine white horse joked that he’d been delayed playing a game of whist. So, I took out my Webley revolver and I shot him in the head, stole his horse, reported him for cowardice. All for a game of chance."

See also

Euchre
Bridge
Napoleon
Skat
Solo whist
Tarneeb
Vint
42

References

Bibliography

External links

 Rules of Card Games: Whist
 Whist Counters, Whist Markers
 Whist on the Internet Archive (includes a number of 19th century manuals)
 A short treatise on the game of whist by Edmond Hoyle (1743)
The Laws and Principles of Whist by Cavendish (1889)

 
18th-century card games
English card games
French deck card games
Four-player card games